Kolega is a Croatian surname. Notable people with the surname include:

Elias Kolega (born 1996), Croatian alpine ski racer
Samuel Kolega (born 1999), Croatian alpine ski racer

Croatian surnames
Slavic-language surnames
Patronymic surnames